Eleni Evangel is a former Australian politician who was the member for the Western Australian Legislative Assembly seat of Perth from 2013 to 2017. She was a City of Perth councillor between 2005 and 2013.

Evangel, who is of Greek descent, was born in Perth and has a teaching and television presenting background. She is the daughter of Anastasios Parissis, once a prominent nightclub and restaurant owner in Northbridge.
 
She was elected to the Legislative Assembly seat of Perth at the general election of 9 March 2013.   She attained 48.6% of the primary vote and won on preferences. She ran again in 2017 and lost.

References

External links
 Parliament profile

1965 births
Living people
Australian people of Greek descent
Members of the Western Australian Legislative Assembly
Politicians from Perth, Western Australia
Liberal Party of Australia members of the Parliament of Western Australia
Perth City Councillors
21st-century Australian politicians
21st-century Australian women politicians
Women members of the Western Australian Legislative Assembly
Women local councillors in Australia